Mission Creek is a stream in the U.S. state of Minnesota. It is a tributary of the Saint Louis River.

Mission Creek took its name from an Ojibwe Indian mission founded near the creek.

See also
List of rivers of Minnesota

References

Rivers of Carlton County, Minnesota
Rivers of St. Louis County, Minnesota
Rivers of Minnesota